Christine Susan Johnston (born 31 March 1975) is a British windsurfer. She competed for Great Britain in the 2000 Summer Olympics, finishing 18th in women's Mistral One Design class. She won the 2003 Formula Windsurfing World Championships After retiring from professional sailing she went on to sell equipment and teach the new discipline of kite surfing.

References

External links
 

1975 births
Living people
English windsurfers
Female windsurfers
English female sailors (sport)
Olympic sailors of Great Britain
Sailors at the 2000 Summer Olympics – Mistral One Design
Formula Windsurfing class world champions
World champions in sailing for Great Britain
Sportspeople from Reading, Berkshire